Comedy Central's Indecision is a series of features on Comedy Central spoofing US elections.

It may refer to:
Comedy Central's Indecision 2000
Comedy Central's Indecision 2008

See also
The Daily Show: Indecision (disambiguation)